Waddell House or Waddel House may refer to:

Church-Waddel-Brumby House, Athens, Georgia, listed on the NRHP in Georgia
Waddell House (Lexington, Missouri), listed on the NRHP in Missouri
George Waddell House, Anaconda, Montana, listed on the NRHP in Montana
William Waddell House, Grassy Creek, North Carolina, listed on the NRHP in North Carolina
Waddel Mansion, Webster, South Dakota, listed on the NRHP in South Dakota